Bulgaria selected their Junior Eurovision Song Contest 2007 entry by a national final, which was held on 29 September 2007. The winner was Bon-Bon with the song "Bonbolandiya" which represented Bulgaria in Junior Eurovision Song Contest 2007 on 8 December 2007.

Before Junior Eurovision

National final 
The final took place on 29 September 2007 at the Hall 2 of the National Palace of Culture in Sofia, hosted by Doni, Katya and Tanya. Ten songs competed and the winner was determined by public televoting. Voting was open for 10 minutes, and at the conclusion of the voting, "Bonbolandiya" performed by Bon-Bon were the winners, receiving almost 25% of the public vote.

At Junior Eurovision
Bulgaria performed 8th in the running order, following Romania and preceding Serbia. Bulgaria placed 7th with 86 points, which was then the best record for Bulgaria in the contest, while Krisia broke the record with Hassan & Ibrahim in 2014, when they came second with 147 points, which is now Bulgaria's best result in the contest.

Voting

Notes

References

Bulgaria
2007
Junior Eurovision Song Contest